George Ali Murad Khan II Talpur (born 29 June 1933) is a member of the Talpur dynasty who was the Mir (ruler) of Khairpur from 1947 to 1954. At an age of nine months, Khan was mistakenly shot by his father. Although the bullet passed through his right lung and stomach, he survived. Ascending to the throne after his father's removal from power, he chose to accede to the Dominion of Pakistan in the same year and was invested with full powers by Liaquat Ali Khan in 1951. Three years later, the state merged with Pakistan, removing Khan's sovereign status. Khan fathered two sons, Abbas Raza Khan and Mehdi Raza Khan and one daughter Zahra from his second wife.

Early life
Khan was born on 29 June 1933 at Brighton, Sussex in United Kingdom to Mir Faiz Muhammad Khan Talpur II and Dulhan Pasha Begum. He studied at St Bonaventure's High School in Hyderabad followed by Aitchison College, Lahore, before graduating from the University of Cambridge.

At an age of nine months, Khan was mistakenly shot by his father. Although the bullet passed through his right lung and stomach, he survived.

Reign
Khan's father Faiz Muhammad Khan II was deposed by the British on 19 July 1947, due to being declared mentally unfit. On 24 July, he ascended the throne at Faiz Mahal but a regency board, consisting of his close relatives was created to govern the state on his behalf, as he was a minor.

On 4 August 1947, the state government issued a notification declaring that 15 August would be celebrated as the state's Independence Day. On that day, with the partition of British India into two new dominions, Pakistan and India, the princely states became fully independent. Most of the future princely states of Pakistan took no immediate action to accede to it. However, after some negotiation, on 3 October, Mir Ghulam Hussain Khan, one of the regents, signed an instrument of accession on behalf of Khan, acceding the state to the Dominion of Pakistan. It thus became one of the first two princely states of Pakistan.

A supplementary instrument signed on 1 February 1949 considerably reduced the effective powers of Khan and the Durbar, giving Pakistan control of the armed forces and also agreeing that the chief-minister of the state would be appointed only after consultation with the national government. The Government of Khairpur Act, 1949, was initiated quasi-democratic reforms and established a 15-member legislative assembly composed of local representatives, making Khairpur one of the first two princely states of Pakistan (the other one being Bahawalpur) where universal adult franchise was enabled for the first time. But, democratic ideals failed to develop, given that the proceedings of the assembly were allowed to be vetoed by the Chief-minister and additionally, the Chief Minister was granted absolute authority to promulgate laws without the consent of the assembly.  In 1951, Prime Minister Liaquat Ali Khan invested the 18-year-old Khan with absolute ruling powers and disbanded the regents-council. The Government of Khairpur Act was passed in 1953, despite the strong reservations of Khan, converting Khairpur into a province and consolidating further powers in the hands of a centrally appointed chief-minister. On 25 May 1954, the assembly passed a resolution that rejected proposals of a merger with Sindh. Finally, having come to believe a merge was inevitable, the state assembly passed a resolution to unite with the Dominion of Pakistan on 10 November 1954. Ten days later, Khan signed a merger agreement with Pakistan. This merger ended Khan's status as a sovereign.

Personal life
Khan's first wife was Ghulam Saddiquah Begum, the daughter of Nawab Sadeq Mohammad Khan V of Bahawalpur State, whom he married at the Sadiqgarh Palace in Bahawalpur. His second wife was Alya Talpur, a daughter of religious scholar Allama Rasheed Turabi. She died on 8 February 2019. Khan fathered two sons, Abbas Raza Khan and Mehdi Raza Khan and one daughter Zahra from his second wife.

Bibliography 
Notes

References 
 
  

1933 births
Living people
People from Khairpur District
Indian monarchs
Talpur dynasty
Aitchison College alumni
Alumni of the University of Cambridge